The Consensus 2004 College Basketball All-American team, as determined by aggregating the results of four major All-American teams.  To earn "consensus" status, a player must win honors from a majority of the following teams: the Associated Press, the USBWA, The Sporting News and the National Association of Basketball Coaches.

2004 Consensus All-America team

Individual All-America teams

AP Honorable Mention:

 Tony Allen, Oklahoma State
 Rafael Araújo, Brigham Young
 Andre Barrett, Seton Hall
 Odell Bradley, IUPUI
 Darren Brooks, Southern Illinois
 Dee Brown, Illinois
 Antonio Burks, Memphis
 Taylor Coppenrath, Vermont
 Erik Daniels, Kentucky
 Miah Davis, Pacific
 Paul Davis, Michigan State
 Greg Davis, Troy
 Luol Deng, Duke
 Ike Diogu, Arizona State
 B. J. Elder, Georgia Tech
 Gerald Fitch, Kentucky
 Luis Flores, Manhattan
 Jason Forte, Brown
 Matt Freije, Vanderbilt
 Francisco García, Louisville
 Danny Gathings, High Point
 Ben Gordon, Connecticut
 David Harrison, Colorado
 David Hawkins, Temple
 Kris Humphries, Minnesota
 LeRoy Hurd, Texas–San Antonio
 Andre Iguodala, Arizona
 Arthur Johnson, Missouri
 Domonic Jones, VCU
 Carl Krauser, Pittsburgh
 Jaime Lloreda, LSU
 Bryant Matthews, Virginia Tech
 Sean May, North Carolina
 Attarius Norwood, Mississippi Valley State
 Dylan Page, Wisconsin–Milwaukee
 Chris Paul, Wake Forest
 Tim Pickett, Florida State
 JJ Redick, Duke
 Anthony Roberson, Florida
 Ron Robinson, Central Connecticut State
 Austen Rowland, Lehigh
 Romain Sato, Xavier
 Alvin Snow, Eastern Washington
 Kirk Snyder, Nevada
 Chris Thomas, Notre Dame
 Ronny Turiaf, Gonzaga
 Cuthbert Victor, Murray State
 Zakee Wadood, East Tennessee State
 Nick Welch, Air Force
 Mike Wells, Western Kentucky
 Delonte West, Saint Joseph's
 Mike Williams, Western Michigan
 Shelden Williams, Duke
 Thurman Zimmerman, South Carolina State

References

NCAA Men's Basketball All-Americans
All-Americans